St Matthew's Church, Boughton is a Grade II listed parish church in the Church of England in Boughton, Nottinghamshire.

History

The church dates from 1868 and was designed by James Fowler of Louth. It replaced the previous church which had fallen into a dilapidated state.

Parish status

The church is in a joint parish with 
St Giles' Church, Ollerton
St Paulinus' Church, New Ollerton

Organ

The church has a two manual pipe organ by H.S. Vincent and Co dating from 1906. A specification of the organ can be found on the National Pipe Organ Register.

References

Boughton
Grade II listed churches in Nottinghamshire
Churches completed in 1868